Oidaematophorus borbonicus is a moth of the family Pterophoridae that is known from La Réunion.

References

Oidaematophorini
Moths described in 1991
Plume moths of Africa
Moths of Réunion
Moths of Africa